Hungarians, also known as Magyars, are a nation and ethnic group native to Hungary and historical Hungarian lands who share a common culture, history, ancestry and language. The Hungarian language belongs to the Uralic language family. There are an estimated 15 million ethnic Hungarians and their descendants worldwide, of whom 9.6 million live in today's Hungary. About 2 million Hungarians live in areas that were part of the Kingdom of Hungary before the Treaty of Trianon in 1920 and are now parts of Hungary's seven neighbouring countries, Slovakia, Ukraine, Romania, Serbia, Croatia, Slovenia, and Austria. Significant groups of people with Hungarian ancestry live in various other parts of the world, most of them in the United States, Canada, Germany, France, the United Kingdom, Chile, Brazil, Australia, and Argentina.

Hungarians can be divided into several subgroups according to local linguistic and cultural characteristics; subgroups with distinct identities include the Székelys (in eastern Transylvania), the Csángós (in Western Moldavia), the Palóc, and the Matyó.

Name 

The Hungarians' own ethnonym to denote themselves in the Early Middle Ages is uncertain. The exonym "Hungarian" is thought to be derived from Oghur-Turkic On-Ogur (literally "Ten Arrows" or "Ten Tribes"). Another possible explanation comes from the Old East Slavic "Yugra" ("Югра"). It may refer to the Hungarians during a time when they dwelt east of the Ural Mountains along the natural borders of Europe and Asia before their conquest of the Carpathian Basin. 

Prior to the Hungarian conquest of the Carpathian Basin in 895/6 and while they lived on the steppes of Eastern Europe east of the Carpathian Mountains, written sources called the Magyars "Hungarians", specifically: "Ungri" by Georgius Monachus in 837, "Ungri" by Annales Bertiniani in 862, and "Ungari" by the Annales ex Annalibus Iuvavensibus in 881. The Magyars/Hungarians probably belonged to the Onogur tribal alliance, and it is possible that they became its ethnic majority. In the Early Middle Ages, the Hungarians had many names, including "Węgrzy" (Polish), "Ungherese" (Italian), "Ungar" (German), and "Hungarus". The "H-" prefix is a later addition of Medieval Latin.

The Hungarian people refer to themselves by the demonym "Magyar" rather than "Hungarian". "Magyar" possibly derived from the name of the most prominent Hungarian tribe, the "Megyer". The tribal name "Megyer" became "Magyar" in reference to the Hungarian people as a whole.

The Greek cognate of "Tourkia" was used by the scholar and Byzantine Emperor Constantine VII "Porphyrogenitus" in his De Administrando Imperio of c. AD 950, though in his use, "Turks" always referred to Magyars. This was a misnomer, as while the Magyars do have some Turkic genetic and cultural influence, including their historical social structure being of Turkic origin, they still are not widely considered as part of the Turkic people.

The obscure name kerel or keral, found in the 13th-century work the Secret History of the Mongols, possibly referred to Hungarians and derived from the Hungarian title király 'king'.

The historical Latin phrase "Natio Hungarica" ("Hungarian nation") had a wider and political meaning because it once referred to all nobles of the Kingdom of Hungary, regardless of their ethnicity or mother tongue.

History

Origin 

The origin of Hungarians, the place and time of their ethnogenesis, has been a matter of debate. The Hungarian language is classified as an Ugric language, and Hungarians are commonly considered an Ugric people that originated from the Ural Mountains, Western Siberia or the Middle Volga region. The relatedness of Hungarians with other Ugric peoples is confirmed by linguistic and genetic data, but modern Hungarians have substantial admixture from local European populations. The consensus among linguists is that the Hungarian language is a member of the Uralic family and that it diverged from its Ugric relatives in the first half of the 1st millennium BC, in western Siberia, east of the southern Urals, and arrived into Central Europe by the historical Magyar or Hungarian "conquerors". The historical Magyars were found to show significant affinity to modern Mansi and Khanty people, and stood also in contact with Iranian peoples, Turkic peoples (presumably Oghuric-speakers) and Slavs. The historical Magyars created an alliance of Steppe tribes, consisting of an Ugric/Magyar ruling class, Iranian but also Turkic/Oghuric and Slavic tribes, which conquered the Pannonian Steppe and surrounding regions, giving rise to modern Hungarians and Hungarian culture.

"Hungarian pre-history", i.e. the history of the "ancient Hungarians" before their arrival in the Carpathian basin at the end of the 9th century, is thus a "tenuous construct", based on linguistics, analogies in folklore, archaeology and subsequent written evidence. In the 21st century, historians have argued that "Hungarians" did not exist as a discrete ethnic group or people for centuries before their settlement in the Carpathian basin. Instead, the formation of the people with its distinct identity was a process. According to this view, Hungarians as a people emerged by the 9th century, subsequently incorporating other, ethnically and linguistically divergent, peoples.

Pre-4th century AD

During the 4th millennium BC, the Uralic-speaking peoples who were living in the central and southern regions of the Urals split up. Some dispersed towards the west and northwest and came into contact with Turkic and Iranian speakers who were spreading northwards. From at least 2000 BC onwards, the Ugric-speakers became distinguished from the rest of the Uralic community, of which the ancestors of the Magyars, being located farther south, were the most numerous. Judging by evidence from burial mounds and settlement sites, they interacted with the Indo-Iranian Andronovo culture and Baikal-Altai Asian cultures.

4th century to c. 830

In the 4th and 5th centuries AD, the Hungarians moved to the west of the Ural Mountains, to the area between the southern Ural Mountains and the Volga River, known as Bashkiria (Bashkortostan) and Perm Krai. In the early 8th century, some of the Hungarians moved to the Don River, to an area between the Volga, Don and the Seversky Donets rivers. Meanwhile, the descendants of those Hungarians who stayed in Bashkiria remained there as late as 1241.

The Hungarians around the Don River were subordinates of the Khazar Khaganate. Their neighbours were the archaeological Saltov culture, i.e. Bulgars (Proto-Bulgarians, Onogurs) and the Alans, from whom they learned gardening, elements of cattle breeding and of agriculture. Tradition holds that the Hungarians were organized in a confederacy of seven tribes. The names of the seven tribes were: Jenő, Kér, Keszi, Kürt-Gyarmat, Megyer, Nyék, and Tarján.

c. 830 to c. 895
Around 830, a rebellion broke out in the Khazar khaganate. As a result, three Kabar tribes of the Khazars joined the Hungarians and moved to what the Hungarians call the Etelköz, the territory between the Carpathians and the Dnieper River. The Hungarians faced their first attack by the Pechenegs around 854. The new neighbours of the Hungarians were the Varangians and the eastern Slavs. From 862 onwards, the Hungarians (already referred to as the Ungri) along with their allies, the Kabars, started a series of looting raids from the Etelköz into the Carpathian Basin, mostly against the Eastern Frankish Empire (Germany) and Great Moravia, but also against the Balaton principality and Bulgaria.

Entering the Carpathian Basin (c. 895)

In 895/896, under the leadership of Árpád, some Hungarians crossed the Carpathians and entered the Carpathian Basin. The tribe called Megyer was the leading tribe of the Hungarian alliance that conquered the centre of the basin. At the same time (c. 895), due to their involvement in the 894–896 Bulgaro-Byzantine war, Hungarians in Etelköz were attacked by Bulgaria and then by their old enemies the Pechenegs. The Bulgarians won the decisive battle of Southern Buh. It is uncertain whether or not those conflicts contributed to the Hungarian departure from Etelköz.

From the upper Tisza region of the Carpathian Basin, the Hungarians intensified their looting raids across continental Europe. In 900, they moved from the upper Tisza river to Transdanubia, which later became the core of the arising Hungarian state. By 902, the borders were pushed to the South-Moravian Carpathians and the Principality of Moravia collapsed. At the time of the Hungarian migration, the land was inhabited only by a sparse population of Slavs, numbering about 200,000, who were either assimilated or enslaved by the Hungarians.

Archaeological findings (e.g. in the Polish city of Przemyśl) suggest that many Hungarians remained to the north of the Carpathians after 895/896. There is also a consistent Hungarian population in Transylvania, the Székelys, who comprise 40% of the Hungarians in Romania. The Székely people's origin, and in particular the time of their settlement in Transylvania, is a matter of historical controversy.

After 900 

In 907, the Hungarians destroyed a Bavarian army in the Battle of Pressburg and laid the territories of present-day Germany, France, and Italy open to Hungarian raids, which were fast and devastating. The Hungarians defeated the Imperial Army of Louis the Child, son of Arnulf of Carinthia and last legitimate descendant of the German branch of the house of Charlemagne, near Augsburg in 910. From 917 to 925, Hungarians raided through Basle, Alsace, Burgundy, Saxony, and Provence. Hungarian expansion was checked at the Battle of Lechfeld in 955, ending their raids against Western Europe, but raids on the Balkan Peninsula continued until 970.

The Pope approved Hungarian settlement in the area when their leaders converted to Christianity, and Stephen I (Szent István, or Saint Stephen) was crowned King of Hungary in 1001. The century between the arrival of the Hungarians from the eastern European plains and the consolidation of the Kingdom of Hungary in 1001 was dominated by pillaging campaigns across Europe, from Dania (Denmark) to the Iberian Peninsula (contemporary Spain and Portugal). After the acceptance of the nation into Christian Europe under Stephen I, Hungary served as a bulwark against further invasions from the east and south, especially by the Turks.

At this time, the Hungarian nation numbered around 400,000 people.

Early modern period 
The first accurate measurements of the population of the Kingdom of Hungary including ethnic composition were carried out in 1850–51. There is a debate among Hungarian and non-Hungarian (especially Slovak and Romanian) historians about the possible changes in the ethnic structure of the region throughout history. Some historians support the theory that the proportion of Hungarians in the Carpathian Basin was at an almost constant 80% during the Middle Ages. Non-Hungarians numbered hardly more than 20% to 25% of the total population. The Hungarian population began to decrease only at the time of the Ottoman conquest, reaching as low as around 39% by the end of the 18th century. The decline of the Hungarians was due to the constant wars, Ottoman raids, famines, and plagues during the 150 years of Ottoman rule. The main zones of war were the territories inhabited by the Hungarians, so the death toll depleted them at a much higher rate than among other nationalities. In the 18th century, their proportion declined further because of the influx of new settlers from Europe, especially Slovaks, Serbs and Germans. In 1715 (after the Ottoman occupation), the Southern Great Plain was nearly uninhabited but now has 1.3 million inhabitants, nearly all of them Hungarians. As a consequence, having also the Habsburg colonization policies, the country underwent a great change in ethnic composition as its population more than tripled to 8 million between 1720 and 1787, while only 39% of its people were Hungarians, who lived primarily in the centre of the country.

Other historians, particularly Slovaks and Romanians, argue that the drastic change in the ethnic structure hypothesized by Hungarian historians in fact did not occur. In particular, there is a fierce debate among Hungarians and Romanian historians about the ethnic composition of Transylvania through these times. For instance, Ioan-Aurel Pop argues that the Hungarian army of 9-10th centuries, while it was eminently suitable for raids, was not at all fit to occupy territories already densely inhabited, especially in the hilly and mountainous areas. He adds that Hungarians, outside of Alföld, region where they were seminomadic during this time, were not able to become colonizers, and that for this reason the regions of Transylvania, Upper Hungary and Croatia were integrated in the Hungarian Kingdom in a later stage, after the year 1000, after the sedentarization, Christianization and partial feudalization of the Hungarians. Pop ignores that plenty Magyar artifacts and burial sites have been found in Transylvania from the 10th century. Dennis Hupchick writes the Hungarians began to populate the region actively from the 11th century.

19th century to present 
In the 19th century, the proportion of Hungarians in the Kingdom of Hungary rose gradually, reaching over 50% by 1900 due to higher natural growth and Magyarization. Between 1787 and 1910 the number of ethnic Hungarians rose from 2.3 million to 10.2 million, accompanied by the resettlement of the Great Hungarian Plain and Délvidék by mainly Roman Catholic Hungarian settlers from the northern and western counties of the Kingdom of Hungary.

Spontaneous assimilation was an important factor, especially among the German and Jewish minorities and the citizens of the bigger towns. On the other hand, about 1.5 million people (about two-thirds non-Hungarian) left the Kingdom of Hungary between 1890–1910 to escape from poverty.

The years 1918 to 1920 were a turning point in the Hungarians' history. By the Treaty of Trianon, the Kingdom had been cut into several parts, leaving only a quarter of its original size. One-third of the Hungarians became minorities in the neighbouring countries. During the remainder of the 20th century, the Hungarians population of Hungary grew from 7.1 million (1920) to around 10.4 million (1980), despite losses during the Second World War and the wave of emigration after the attempted revolution in 1956. The number of Hungarians in the neighbouring countries tended to remain the same or slightly decreased, mostly due to assimilation (sometimes forced; see Slovakization and Romanianization) and to emigration to Hungary (in the 1990s, especially from Transylvania and Vojvodina).

After the "baby boom" of the 1950s (Ratkó era), a serious demographic crisis began to develop in Hungary and its neighbours. The Hungarian population reached its maximum in 1980, then began to decline.

For historical reasons (see Treaty of Trianon), significant Hungarian minority populations can be found in the surrounding countries, most of them in Romania (in Transylvania), Slovakia, and Serbia (in Vojvodina). Sizable minorities live also in Ukraine (in Transcarpathia), Croatia (primarily Slavonia), and Austria (in Burgenland). Slovenia is also host to a number of ethnic Hungarians, and Hungarian language has an official status in parts of the Prekmurje region. Today more than two million ethnic Hungarians live in nearby countries.

There was a referendum in Hungary in December 2004 on whether to grant Hungarian citizenship to Hungarians living outside Hungary's borders (i.e. without requiring a permanent residence in Hungary). The referendum failed due to insufficient voter turnout. On 26 May 2010, Hungary's Parliament passed a bill granting dual citizenship to ethnic Hungarians living outside of Hungary. Some neighboring countries with sizable Hungarian minorities expressed concerns over the legislation.

Ethnic affiliations and genetic origins

The Hungarian language belongs to the Uralic language family. Modern Hungarians are however genetically rather distant from their closest linguistic relatives (Mansi and Khanty), and more similar to the neighbouring non-Uralic neighbors. Modern Hungarians share a small but significant "Western Siberian" component with other Uralic-speaking populations maximized among modern Khanty. The historical Magyars had a higher "Western Siberian" component as well as strong links to the populations of the Baraba region, Inner Asia, Eastern Europe, Northern Europe and Central Asia. Modern Hungarians also display noteworthy affinity with historical Sintashta culture samples.

Archeological mtDNA haplogroups show a similarity between Hungarians and Turkic-speaking Tatars and Bashkirs, while another study found a link between the Khanty and Bashkirs, suggesting that the Bashkirs are a mixture of Turkic, Ugric and Indo-European contributions. The homeland of ancient Hungarians is around the Ural Mountains, and the Hungarian affinities with the Karayakupovo culture is widely accepted among researchers. A full genome study by Triska et al. 2017 found that the Bashkirs "were strongly influenced by Ancient North Eurasians, highlighting a mismatch of their cultural background and genetic ancestry and an intricacy of the historic interface between Turkic and Uralic populations". The proto-Uralic peoples homeland may have been the Okunev culture, a forest culture in the Altai-Sayan region, characterized by high genetic affinity to the Botai culture in Northern Central Asia and the ancient Tarim mummies in modern day Xinjiang, as well as Western Siberian hunter-gatherers (WSHG). Their "eastern" genetic affinities may be explained by contact with proto-Turkic peoples. The arrival of the Indo-European Afanasievo culture may have caused the dispersal and expansion of proto-Uralic languages along the Seima-Turbino cultural area.

According to Neparáczki: "From all recent and archaic populations tested the Volga Tatars show the smallest genetic distance to the entire Conqueror population" and "a direct genetic relation of the Conquerors to Onogur-Bulgar ancestors of these groups is very feasible." Genetic data found that among "Western Turkic speakers, like Chuvash and Volga Tatar, the East Asian component was detected only in low amounts (~ 5%)", linking them to both Magyar conquerors and the historical Bolgars.

Paternal haplogroups 
According to a study by Pamjav, the area of Bodrogköz suggested to be a population isolate found an elevated frequency of Haplogroup N: R1a-M458 (20.4%), I2a1-P37 (19%), R1a-Z280 (14.3%), and E1b-M78 (10.2%). Various R1b-M343 subgroups accounted for 15% of the Bodrogköz population. Haplogroup N1c-Tat covered 6.2% of the lineages, but most of it belonged to the N1c-VL29 subgroup, which is more frequent among Balto-Slavic speaking than Finno-Ugric speaking peoples. Other haplogroups had frequencies of less than 5%.

Among 100 Hungarian men, 90 of whom from the Great Hungarian Plain, the following haplogroups and frequencies are obtained: 30% R1a, 15% R1b, 13% I2a1, 13% J2, 9% E1b1b1a, 8% I1, 3% G2, 3% J1, 3% I*, 1% E*, 1% F*, 1% K*. The 97 Székelys belong to the following haplogroups: 20% R1b, 19% R1a, 17% I1, 11% J2, 10% J1, 8% E1b1b1a, 5% I2a1, 5% G2, 3% P*, 1% E*, 1% N. It can be inferred that Szekelys have more significant German admixture or/and stand closer to Botai culture, tochcarians as shown by the Tarim mummies. A study sampling 45 Palóc from Budapest and northern Hungary, found 60% R1a, 13% R1b, 11% I, 9% E, 2% G, 2% J2.  A study estimating possible Inner Asian admixture among nearly 500 Hungarians based on paternal lineages only, estimated it at 5.1% in Hungary, at 7.4 in Székelys and at 6.3% at Csángós.

An analysis of Bashkir samples from the Burzyansky and Abzelilovsky districts of the Republic of Bashkortostan in the Volga-Ural region, revealed them to belong to the R1a subclade R1a-SUR51, which is shared in significant amounts with the historical Magyars and the royal Hungarian lineage, and representing the closest kin to the Hungarian Árpád dynasty. This subclade was also found among historical Scytho-Iranian samples in modern day Afghanistan.

Autosomal DNA 
Modern Hungarians show relative close affinity to surrounding populations, but harbour a small "Western Siberian" component maximized among the Ugric Khanty people, and associated with the historical Magyars. Modern Hungarians formed from several historical population groupings, including the historical Magyars, assimilated Slavic and Germanic groups, as well as Central Asian Steppe tribes (presumably Turkic and Iranian tribes). Genetic analyses link parts of the historical Magyars ancestors to West Siberian hunter-gatherers. These historical Western Siberian hunter-gatherers were characterized by high Ancient North Eurasian ancestry and less Eastern Siberian admixture, next to geneflow from Yamnaya Steppe pastoralists.

Historical Magyar genome corresponds largely with the modern Bashkirs, and can be modeled as ~50% Mansi-like, ~35% Sarmatian-like, and ~15% Hun/Xiongnu-like. The admixture event is suggested to have taken place in the Southern Ural region at 643–431 BCE. Modern Hungarians were found to be admixed descendants of the historical Magyar conquerors with local Europeans, as 31 Hungarian samples could be modelled as two-way admixtures of "Conq_Asia_Core" and "EU_Core" in varying degrees. The historical Magyar component among modern Hungarians is estimated at an average frequency of 13%, which can be explained by the relative smaller population size of Magyar conquerors compared to local European groups.

Other influences 

Besides the various peoples mentioned above, the Magyars were later influenced by other populations in the Carpathian Basin. Among these are the Cumans, Pechenegs, Jazones, West Slavs, Germans, and Vlachs (Romanians). Ottomans, who occupied the central part of Hungary from  1526 until  1699, inevitably exerted an influence, as did the various nations (Germans, Slovaks, Serbs, Croats, and others) that resettled the depopulated central and southern territories of the kingdom (roughly present-day South Hungary, Vojvodina in Serbia and Banat in Romania) after their departure. Similar to other European countries, Jewish, Armenian, and Roma (Gypsy) ethnic minorities have been living in Hungary since the Middle Ages.

Diaspora

Hungarian diaspora (Magyar diaspora) is a term that encompasses the total ethnic Hungarian population located outside of current-day Hungary.

Maps

Culture 

The culture of Hungary shows distinctive elements, incorporating local European elements and minor Central Asian/Steppe derived traditions, such as Horse culture and Shamanistic remnants in Hungarian folklore.

Traditional costumes (18th and 19th century)

Folklore and communities

See also

References

Sources
 
 Korai Magyar Történeti Lexicon (9–14. század) (Encyclopedia of the Early Hungarian History (9th–14th Centuries)) Budapest, Akadémiai Kiadó; 753. .
 Károly Kocsis (DSc, University of Miskolc) – Zsolt Bottlik (PhD, Budapest University) – Patrik Tátrai: Etnikai térfolyamatok a Kárpát-medence határon túli régióiban + CD (for detailed data), Magyar Tudományos Akadémia (Hungarian Academy of Sciences) – Földrajtudományi Kutatóintézet (Academy of Geographical Studies); Budapest; 2006.;

External links

 Origins of the Hungarians from the Enciklopédia Humana (with many maps and pictures) 
 Hungarians in the Carpathian Basin
 Hungary and the Council of Europe
 Facts about Hungary 
 Hungarians outside Hungary – Map

Genetic studies
 MtDNA and Y chromosome polymorphisms in Hungary: inferences from the Palaeolithic, Neolithic and Uralic influences on the modern Hungarian gene pool
 
 Human Chromosomal Polymorphism in a Hungarian Sample
 Hungarian genetics researches 2008–2009  

 
 
Ethnic groups in Hungary
Ethnic groups in Austria
Ethnic groups in Romania
Ethnic groups in Serbia
Ethnic groups in Slovakia
Ethnic groups in Slovenia
Ethnic groups in Ukraine
Ethnic groups in Vojvodina
Ethnic groups divided by international borders
Ugric peoples